This list of Airport Service Quality Award winners is a representation of the world's airports, which have been recognised by the Airports Council International (ACI) to be leading in customer satisfaction and have thus received an Airport Service Quality Award (ASQ). The ACI gives out the ASQ, based on passenger satisfaction ratings in the ASQ Survey, which is a global survey based on interviews with passengers on the day of travel. Only airports which have participated in all four quarters of
the year and followed the sampling methodology of the ACI are eligible for an Award.  Along with the World Airport Awards by Skytrax, this award is considered one of the most prestigious accolades in the industry.

Best Airports Worldwide

Best Airport by Region

Africa

Over 20 million passengers

Under 20 million passengers

Asia - Pacific

Over 20 million passengers

Under 20 million passengers

Europe

Over 20 million passengers

Under 20 million passengers

Latin America & Caribbean

Over 20 million passengers

Under 20 million passengers

Middle East

North America

Over 20 million passengers

Under 20 million passengers

Best Airport by Size

Over 40 million

25-40 million

15-25 million

5-15 million

Fewer than 5 million

Best Airport by Size and Region

Best Improvement

Best Domestic Airport
This award recognises airports, based on the results for overall satisfaction as rated solely by domestic passengers. The award has been replaced with the "Best Regional Airport" award in 2010.

Best Regional Airport
This award, replacing the "Best Domestic Airport" in 2010, has been classified since 2012 as recognising only airports with 2 million passengers or less.

Airport People Awards
This award recognizes those airports which have been rated by passengers as having the most courteous and helpful airport, airline and security staff.

References

External links
 Official website of the ACI

Airport Service Quality Award winners